Kuwi may refer to:

 Kuvi or Kuwi, a Dravidian language
 KUWI (FM), a radio station (89.9 FM) licensed to serve Rawlings, Wyoming, United States